Dunaújvárosi Kohász KA is a Hungarian handball club, based in Dunaújváros, Hungary.

European record
As of 24 August 2018:

EHF-organised seasonal competitions
Dunaújvárosi Kohász score listed first. As of 22 January 2019.

Champions League

EHF Cup

Cup Winners' Cup
From the 2016–17 season, the women's competition was merged with the EHF Cup.

Champions Trophy

References

External links
 Official website 
 Dunaújvárosi Kohász KA at eurohandball.com

Hungarian handball clubs in European handball